The Best of Freda Payne is a 12-track collection of songs recorded by Freda Payne. Although it is a collection of previously recorded tracks, it also includes four unissued songs as well: "How Can I Live Without My Life," "Just a Woman," "You're the Only Bargain I've Got," and "Come Back" (none of which were released as singles). Six of the songs on this collection were previously issued as singles for the Invictus label.

Track listing

Album credits
All selections published by: Gold Forever Music, Inc.

Holland-Dozier-Holland Prod., Inc.
Executive producer: Ronald Dunbar
Producers: Greg Perry, General Johnson, William Weatherspoon, Raynard Miner
Arrangers: McKinley Jackson, H.B. Barnum, Tony Camillo
Recording & Mixing: Lawrence T. Horn, Barney Perkins
Art direction: John Hoernle

Charts
Album - Billboard (North America)

References

Freda Payne albums
1972 greatest hits albums